Chertsey railway station serves the town of Chertsey in the Runnymede District of Surrey, England. It is on the Chertsey Loop Line and is operated by South Western Railway.

The first station was opened by the London and South Western Railway, with the initial section of the Chertsey branch line, in 1848.  The existing building, now a Grade II listed building, was opened on 1 October 1866.  It comprises Up and Down platforms having brick buildings: the main building being on the Down side. There is a level crossing here. The platforms can hold ten carriage trains.

Local mythology ascribes the design of the existing station building to William Tite but, in fact, he had stopped all architectural work about 13 years previously.  Historic England says, on this subject, "design thought to have been derived from earlier prototypes by Sir William Tite for L.S.W.R." citing, as its source, the book Victorian Stations: Railway Stations in England and Wales, 1836-1923 by Gordon Biddle 1973.

Original Station 

Whereas the current station is about 40m to the north west of Guildford Street, the original 1848 station was on the other side of Guildford Street to the south east.  At the time it opened and for 18 years thereafter, the line terminated at Guildford Street and the branch line ran only in a south easterly direction to Weybridge railway station.  It was only with opening of the current station in 1866 that the line was completed north westwards to Virginia Water railway station in order to allow travel onward to Egham railway station and Reading railway station.  The original station building was on the north eastern side of the tracks.

Plans showing the layout of both stations are available for viewing, by prior arrangement, in the research section of Chertsey Museum.  An 1848 plan shows the original station at the time it was built.  Plans from 1870-1880 show the current station with new buildings springing up around it but still using the sidings, goods warehouse and engine house on the other side of Guildford Street left over from the original station.

Services
The off peak, Monday to Saturday service is formed of: 
 2 trains per hour to  via  and 
 2 trains per hour to 

External links

Railway stations in Surrey
DfT Category D stations
Former London and South Western Railway stations
Railway stations in Great Britain opened in 1866
Railway stations served by South Western Railway
1866 establishments in England